These Days is the eleventh and final studio album by Canadian country music group Family Brown. The album was released in 1988 by RCA Records and is the group's first album following the death of founding member Joe Brown, who died in 1986. The album includes the singles "Til I Find My Love", "Town of Tears", "Let's Build a Life Together", and "Sure Looks Good", which all charted on the RPM Country Tracks chart in Canada. "Town of Tears" won two awards at the 1989 Canadian Country Music Association Awards including Single of the Year and SOCAN Song of the Year.

Track listing

Chart performance

References

1988 albums
Family Brown albums
RCA Records albums